Amentoflavone is a biflavonoid (bis-apigenin coupled at 8 and 3 positions, or 3,8-biapigenin) constituent of a number of plants including Ginkgo biloba, Chamaecyparis obtusa (hinoki), Hypericum perforatum (St. John's Wort) and Xerophyta plicata.

Amentoflavone can interact with many medications by being a potent inhibitor of CYP3A4 and CYP2C9, which are enzymes responsible for the metabolism of some drugs in the body. It is also an inhibitor of human cathepsin B.

Amentoflavone has a variety of in vitro activities including antimalarial activity, anticancer activity (which may, at least in part, be mediated by its inhibition of fatty acid synthase), and antagonist activity at the κ-opioid receptor (Ke = 490 nmol L−1) as well as activity at the allosteric benzodiazepine site of the GABAA receptor as a negative allosteric modulator.

See also
 Apigenin

References

External links

Flavones
Cytochrome P450 inhibitors
Natural phenol dimers
Resorcinols
Kappa-opioid receptor antagonists
GABAA receptor negative allosteric modulators